The Melody Man is a 1930 American Pre-Code drama musical film produced and distributed by Columbia Pictures. It was directed by Roy William Neill and starred  John St. Polis,  Alice Day and William Collier, Jr. The story is based on a Broadway play by Herbert Fields.

The film is preserved in the Library of Congress.

Plot
Earl von Kemper is a famous Austrian composer who fled to the United States: in Vienna, during his concert in the presence of the emperor, Kemper surprised his beloved woman locked in a boudoir with Frederick, the crown prince. Mad with jealousy, the musician killed the prince, then fleeing with his daughter.

Fifteen years have passed. Kemper earns his living playing the violin in a New York club with two other musicians. His daughter Elsa meets Al Tyler, a jazz musician. The latter overhears Kemper's rhapsody, the one that had been played at the concert for the emperor; he likes music, arranges it, making it a very successful jazz piece. But the music is recognized by Baden, the Austrian police minister, who then prepares to arrest Kemper. The musician then pretends with his daughter that he has obtained an engagement in Europe, leaving the two young lovers in America.

Cast
 Alice Day - Elsa
 William Collier, Jr. - Al Tyler (*billed as Buster Collier)
 Johnnie Walker - Joe Yates
 John St. Polis - Von Kemper
 Mildred Harris - Martha
 Albert Conti - Prince Friedrich
 Anton Vaverka - Franz Josef
 Tenen Holtz - Gustav (uncredited)
 Lee Kohlmar - Adolph (uncredited)

References

External links
 
 The Melody Man, Allmovie.com

1930 films
1930s color films
Columbia Pictures films
American films based on plays
Films directed by Roy William Neill
Films set in Vienna
Films set in New York City
Films about composers
1930s musical drama films
American musical drama films
American black-and-white films
1930 drama films
1930s American films